Jim Senter (born November 9, 1961) is a college sports administrator, currently serving as the athletic director (AD) at the University of Texas at El Paso. Previously from 2014 to 2017, Senter held the same position at The Citadel.

While studying at Coffeyville Community College, Senter served as a student assistant on the powerhouse junior college football program. He then served in the same role at Tulsa for three seasons before completing his degree in physical education. He coached for eight seasons at Idaho.

Senter began his administrative career as an associate athletic director at Idaho, before spending one academic year as AD at Idaho State.  He also spent two seasons as associate AD at San Diego State and eight years at Colorado before assuming the AD role at The Citadel.

On November 22, 2017, The University of Texas at El Paso announced they had hired Senter to be their new Athletics Director. He will serve as their new athletic director while splitting time at The Citadel until he transitions completely in mid December 2017. Senter officially began at UTEP on December 18, 2017.

References

External links 
 UTEP profile

1961 births
Living people
The Citadel Bulldogs athletic directors
Coffeyville Community College alumni
Coffeyville Red Ravens football coaches
Idaho Vandals football coaches
Idaho State Bengals athletic directors
People from Doylestown, Pennsylvania
Tulsa Golden Hurricane football coaches
University of Idaho alumni
University of Tulsa alumni
UTEP Miners athletic directors